See Hear is a monthly magazine programme for deaf and hard-of-hearing people in the United Kingdom, broadcast on Wednesday mornings at 8.00am. The programme focuses on the British and the worldwide deaf community and covers a broad range of topics from areas such as education, deaf people's rights, technology and language. The programme is presented entirely in BSL and is broadcast with voice-over and subtitles in English. This allows both deaf and hearing people (who may be learning sign language) to understand the programme. See Hear is currently the fifth longest-running BBC programme.

History

1980s
See Hear was launched on BBC1 on 11 October 1981, initially as a series of 20 programmes. It was broadcast with open subtitles, and was presented in sign by Martin Colville, a hearing CODA, and a Deaf presenter Maggie Woolley. The programme was originally broadcast on Sunday afternoons during lunchtime. As the series went from strength to strength different topics, such as discussions, chat shows, and special editions focussing on technology and education for Deaf people were added that ran alongside the original magazine.

Over the years See Hear appeal within the Deaf community increased, and with it the involvement of Clive Mason, the series' longest serving presenter who joined in 1984. Clive was prominently involved with the See Hear Christmas and pantomime specials written by Terry Ruane and the late Dorothy Miles, two deaf people with strong backgrounds in Theatre.  By the late 1980s the show was focussed on the important issues and concerns of members of the Deaf community. As the show's popularity grew more Deaf staff were recruited to work on the show, both behind the scenes as well as in front of the camera. As the show neared its 10th anniversary, the BBC, along with other Deaf organisations felt that it needed a change to keep it fresh.

See Hear took a brief hiatus from broadcast, while the format of the show was revamped. The new format had a broader scope than the previous one, because the producers felt that Deaf people were interested in different activities and experiences outside of their own community. When See Hear was broadcast following the new format the audience almost doubled. The new format was a success, and with this the BBC recognised BSL as a language.

1990s
During the late 1990s, See Hear was moved from the Sunday lunchtime slot to the Saturday morning slot. At this time the show was once again revamped, with new titles and music created for it. The show was also moved to the Light House in Wolverhampton and new presenter Lara Crooks joined the staff. It was renamed See Hear on Saturday. Since the time of this revamp, the show has constantly upgraded itself to keep up with the changes within the deaf community.

From 5 February 1990, a recorded version of the BBC Breakfast News 7.00am bulletin from BBC One was shown on BBC Two for 15 minutes from 8.00 am – 8.15 am with sign language and subtitles under the name See Hear Breakfast News. From 9 October 1995, it moved to 7.00am which was a simulcast with BBC One, with Children's BBC following at 7.15am. By February 1996, Children's BBC began at 7.30 am with Breakfast News starting at 7.15am instead of 7.00am. Starting on 6 October 1997 the programme returned to its 7:00am slot from 1995, with CBBC beginning at 7.15am. This practice stopped in April 1998, thus, the weekday CBBC block began on BBC Two full time from 7.00am. Sign language on Breakfast continues to appear from 7.00 am onwards on BBC News.

2000s
In 2001, See Hear celebrated its 20th anniversary with three new TV projects: Switch, a drama series that revolved around the lives and relationships of people in the deaf community; The House on the Hill for young Deaf children, written by viewer Amy Possart and presented by Lesley McGilp and Julian Peedle-Calloo, and Hay's Way, showcasing the history of various cities around the UK through deaf academic and historian John Hay's visits.

Five years later, See Hear celebrated its 25th anniversary with a retrospective of See Hear'''s 25-year history. In October, coinciding with the 25th anniversary, See Hear switched from open subtitles, in use since 1981, to closed subtitles, which has to be activated for subtitles to appear on screen.

At the end of the 2006–2007 series, it was announced that See Hear would move its usual broadcast day from Saturday to Wednesday.

2010s
As of January 2013, See Hear'' airs on BBC Two on the first Wednesday of every month at around 8:00am, although this schedule would sometimes be altered if any events occur in the schedule (e.g. Christmas & New Year).

William Mager was appointed to produce the 33rd series in July 2013, which makes him See Hear's first deaf series producer since Terry Riley's departure in 2008. The following year, the 34th series was commissioned to be aired weekly until March 2015.

See also 
 Doug Alker
 Arthur Dimmock

References

External links 
 
 
 BBC Ariel interview with William Mager

1981 British television series debuts
1980s British television series
1990s British television series
2000s British television series
2010s British television series
2020s British television series
BBC Television shows
Deaf culture in the United Kingdom
Sign language television shows
Deafness
Deaf culture
British Sign Language
Television shows about deaf people